The men's competition in the middle-heavyweight (– 94 kg) division was held on 11–12 November 2011.

Schedule

Medalists

Records

Results

References

(Pages 47, 48, 52 & 56) Start List 
2011 IWF World Championships Results Book Pages 44–46 
Results

2011 World Weightlifting Championships